As part of the effort to spread the game of Go throughout the world, several Go centers were founded in the United States, Europe and South America. A large part of the required funds was contributed by the Iwamoto Foundation. This foundation  was founded by Iwamoto Kaoru (1902–1999), donating 530 million yen from his own means.

Recently a Korean project established a Go Centre in Budapest, Hungary.

References

External links

Local centers
 Seattle go center
 São Paulo go center
 Amsterdam go center
 London go center
 New York go center (1995 - 2010)